Baker Hill or variant, may refer to:

 Baker Hill site, a 16th-century Huron-Wendat village, see Ratcliff Site, Wendat (Huron) Ancestral Village
 Bakers Hill, Western Australia, a town in Australia
 Bakerhill, Alabama, a town in U.S.A.
 Baker's Hill, England, a village in UK

See also
 Baker (disambiguation)
 Mount Baker (disambiguation)
 Baker Mountain (disambiguation)